{
  "type": "FeatureCollection",
  "features": [
    {
      "type": "Feature",
      "properties": {},
      "geometry": {
        "type": "Point",
        "coordinates": [
          10.7822,
          106.7028
        ]
      }
    }
  ]
}

Bến Nghé is a historic area of Saigon which is today a ward of District 1. The area was developed in the 17th century. At the time the French Empire arrived in Saigon, Bến Nghé was a conglomeration of 40 villages along the Bến Nghé River.

Notable buildings in the ward include the 1935 Jamia Al Muslimin Mosque at 66 Đông Du Street, also known as the Saigon Central Mosque, oldest and best known of the twelve mosques in HCMC.

References

Populated places in Ho Chi Minh City